The Mangla Gauri temple in Shakti Peetham, Gaya, Bihar, India has been mentioned in Padma Purana, Vayu Purana and Agni Purana and Devi Bhagvata Purana and Markandeya Purana in other scriptures and tantric works. This temple is among the eighteen maha shaktipeeth. The present temple dates back to the 15th century. The shrine is dedicated to Sati or the Mother Goddess in the predominantly Vaishnavite pilgrimage center of Gaya. Mangalagauri is worshiped as the Goddess of benevolence. This temple constitutes an Upa-Shakti Peeth — where it is believed that a part of the body of Sati fell according to mythology. Here Sati is worshipped in the form of a breast, a symbol of nourishment. It is believed that whoever comes to Maa Durga with his wishes and prayers, returns successfully with all of prayers and wishes come true.

The temple is facing east and is built on top of the Mangalagauri hill. A flight of steps and a motorable road lead to it. The sanctum houses the symbol of the Goddess and it has some finely carved ancient relief sculptures. A small hall or mandap stands in front of the temple. The courtyard houses a fire pit for the hōma.

There are two minor shrines dedicated to Shiva and images of Mahishasura Mardini, Durga, and Dakshina Kali.

The temple complex encompasses of temples of Maa Kali, Lord Ganesha, Lord Hanuman and Lord Shiva.

References
 www.durga-puja.org/mangalagauri-temple.html
 Hindu Pilgrimage, by Sunita Pant Bansal
 Maa Mangla Gauri Gaya - A Hindu holy temple

Hindu temples in Bihar
Gaya, India
Shakti Peethas
Tourist attractions in Gaya district